Yevgeny Kafelnikov won in the final 6–2, 6–2 against Guillaume Raoux.

Seeds

Draw

Finals

Top half

Bottom half

External links
Draw

St. Petersburg Open
St. Petersburg Open
1995 in Russian tennis